() (1176 – 1227) was the Ayyubid emir of Damascus from 1218 to 1227. The son of Sultan al-Adil I and nephew of Saladin, founder of the dynasty, al-Mu'azzam was installed by his father as governor of Damascus in 1198 or 1200. After his father's death in 1218, al-Mu'azzam ruled the Ayyubid lands in Syria in his own name, down to his own death in 1227. He was succeeded by his son, an-Nasir Dawud.

He was respected as a man of letters, and was interested in grammar and jurisprudence.
By 1204, Jerusalem was his primary residence.

Legacy 

  Extending the terrace of the Dome of the Rock by 18 meters westward.
 Two water-distribution structures: as a donor, not as a patron (one who ordered them built):
 1210 or 1211: the Cistern of al-Muʿaẓẓam ʿĪsā, a water tank.
 1216 or 1217: the Shaʿlān Sebil, a sebil (fountain).
 1217 or 1218: restoring the arched portico of al-Aqsa Mosque's façade, adding a pendentive dome over the main entrance.
 The Market of Knowledge: a Hanbalite prayer place in the southeast corner of the compound; demolished in the 19th century.
 1213-14: ten cross-vaulted bays on piers in the central section of the compound's north portico (of the compound's northern wall).
 1211-12: renovating the southeastern colonnade.
 New door leaves for the Superintendant's Gate and Remission Gate.

He founded these madrasas:

 1207: an-Naḥawiyya Madrasa (Grammarians' Madrasa), which is on the extended terrace he made. 
 1209–1218: al-Muʿaẓẓamīya Madrasa (al-Hanafiyya Madrasa), Jerusalem: specialized in Hanafi jurisprudence (now al-Mujāhidīn Mosque).
 1214: an-Nāṣiriyya (an-Nāṣriyya): on top of the Golden Gate; named after his uncle, Saladin. It no longer exists.
 al-Muʿaẓẓamīya Madrasa, aṣ-Ṣāliḥiyyah, Damascus: also his family mausoleum.

Furthermore, he modified the walls of Jerusalem and Damascus:
 1202, 1203, 1212 and 1213-14: repairing Jerusalem's walls' fortifications.
 1219: dismantling Jerusalem's walls to preemptively reduce Jerusalem's military strength in case of it falling into the hands of the Crusaders.
 1226: rebuilding Damascus's city wall, likely also refortifying it with a tower at the southeastern corner.

References

1176 births
1227 deaths
13th-century Kurdish people
13th-century Ayyubid rulers
Hanafis
Maturidis
Ayyubid emirs of Damascus
Muslims of the Fifth Crusade
Syrian Sunni Muslims
Year of birth unknown